Pianissimo is a Japanese brand of cigarettes, currently owned and manufactured by Japan Tobacco.

Description
Originally it was sold as a light variant of the Salem brand in 1995 which was made by the R. J. Reynolds Tobacco Company. Japan Tobacco acquired the overseas division of RJR and made the Pianissimo brand independent in June 2004. It was first launched and tested in July 2005 in the Miyagi (宮城) and Yamagata (山形) prefectures, and then introduced nationwide in October 2005 Since May 1, 2005, JT handles stocks (Domestic production). Since then, other variants like Petil and Franc were added and other JT Menthol brands were made into Pianissimo. Like Virginia S made by Altria, it is a cigarette specifically aimed at women.

The word Pianissimo refers to the musical dynamics and volumes of sounds or notes. The word pêche is a French term meaning "peach," as well as the peach taste that the cigarettes contain. Produced and sold almost exclusively in Japan, the cigarettes are sold as 20 Cigarettes Per Pack, 10 Packs Per Carton, and 200 Cigarettes Per Carton.

In December 2011, JTI announced they had changed 7 Pianissimo variants. The same thing happened to 9 variants in mid-2016.

Products
Below are all the variants of Pianissimo cigarettes, with the levels of tar and nicotine included.

See also
Fashion brands
Smoking in Japan

References

Japanese cigarette brands
Japan Tobacco brands